Kampuchea is a native name of Cambodia, a country located in Mainland Southeast Asia.

Kampuchea may also refer to:
States:
Kingdom of Kampuchea (1945), a puppet state of the Japanese Empire during World War II
Democratic Kampuchea, a communist state that existed from 1975 to 1979
People's Republic of Kampuchea, the communist state successor that existed from 1979 to 1989
Political parties:
Communist Party of Kampuchea, a communist party existed in Cambodia from 1951 to 1981
Party of Democratic Kampuchea, a political party existed in Cambodia from 1981 to 1993
Armed forces:
Liberation Army of Kampuchea, armed forces of a former communist state, Democratic Kampuchea, existed from 1977 to 1979
Organisations:
People's Revolutionary Youth Union of Kampuchea, a youth organisation existed in Cambodia
Regions:
Kampuchea Krom, a name referred by Cambodians to a region consists of Mekong Delta and Southeast region of Vietnam

See also
 Vietnam (disambiguation)
 Siam (disambiguation)